Runcorn Bridge may refer to several bridges over the River Mersey and the Manchester Ship Canal in England:

 Mersey Gateway, a road bridge opened in 2017
 Runcorn Railway Bridge, a rail bridge opened in 1868
 Silver Jubilee Bridge or Runcorn–Widnes Bridge, a road bridge opened in 1961
 Widnes-Runcorn Transporter Bridge, opened in 1905 and demolished in 1961